Vatricania is a monotypic genus of flowering plants belonging to the family Cactaceae. It just contains one species, Vatricania guentheri Greenm. ex Gleason  It has the common name of Red Tail Cactus.

Its native range is Bolivia. It is found in dry forest vegetation or covering hillsides, at altitudes of   metres above sea level.

Description
An evergreen, perennial columnar cactus.
It has about 27 ribs. 
The flowers are initially borne in a cephalium (reddish brown wool,) running down from the crown (top of the plant) on one side, of the branches, later in a superficial dome cephalium.
It has edible fruit.

Taxonomy

The genus name of Vatricania is in honour of Louis Félix Vatrican (1904–2007), an agricultural engineer from Monaco, director of the national Jardin Exotique.  The Latin specific epithet of guentheri refers to Ernesto Günther of Valparaíso, Chile, who financed the expedition in Bolivia during which Carl Troll discovered the species. Kupper had originally spelled the epithet Güntheri.

The genus was first described and published in Cact. Succ. J. (Los Angeles) vol.22 on page 154 in 1950.
Then the species was published in Cact. Succ. J. (Los Angeles) Vol.23 on page 149 in 1951.

It was originally named in 1931 as Cephalocereus guentheri Kupper, being named after Ernesto Günther. Then in 1950 the famous German cactologist Curt
Backeberg created the monotypic genus of Vatricania to accommodate this unique species, it was lumped into Espostoa in 1959.

Vatricania was once thought to be a synonym of Espostoa , (or still is in some sources,) including by the United States Department of Agriculture and the Agricultural Research Service in 2005, and they also do not list any known species. Or it might have a hybrid origin as there are differences from Espostoa. Also current molecular evidence suggests that Espostoa is not the correct placement for this species.

The name is accepted by the Royal Horticultural Society in the UK.

It is placed in Trichocereinae Tribe.

Cultivation

Can be grown in the USA, in Zone USDA: 9b-11.
It can survive a minimum average temperature of 55°F (12°C) and can tolerate positions in full sun.

References

External links

Cactoideae
Plants described in 1950
Flora of Bolivia
Monotypic Cactaceae genera
Cactoideae genera